Steffi Graf was the defending champion but did not compete that year.

The final was won by Gabriela Sabatini 6–2, 4–6, 6–1 against Chris Evert.

Seeds
A champion seed is indicated in bold text while text in italics indicates the round in which that seed was eliminated.

  Gabriela Sabatini (champion)
  Chris Evert (final)
  Helena Suková (semifinals)
  Pam Shriver (fourth round)
  Zina Garrison (semifinals)
  Manuela Maleeva (third round)
 n/a
  Katerina Maleeva (fourth round)
  Mary Joe Fernández (fourth round)
  Lori McNeil (fourth round)
  Helen Kelesi (quarterfinals)
  Arantxa Sánchez (third round)
  Sylvia Hanika (second round)
  Catarina Lindqvist (second round)
  Raffaella Reggi (quarterfinals)
  Susan Sloane (second round)
  Bettina Fulco (third round)
  Nicole Provis (first round)
  Anne Minter (first round)
  Nathalie Tauziat (third round)
  Barbara Paulus (third round)
  Radka Zrubáková (second round)
  Belinda Cordwell (third round)
  Amy Frazier (second round)
  Isabelle Demongeot (quarterfinals)
  Terry Phelps (first round)
  Brenda Schultz (first round)
  Rosalyn Fairbank (second round)
  Elna Reinach (second round)
  Gretchen Magers (fourth round)
  Neige Dias (first round)
  Patricia Tarabini (first round)

Draw

Finals

Top half

Section 1

Section 2

Section 3

Section 4

Bottom half

Section 5

Section 6

Section 7

Section 8

References
 1989 Lipton International Players Championships Draw

Women's Singles